Sam & Max Beyond Time and Space, originally released as Sam & Max: Season Two, is an episodic graphic adventure video game by Telltale Games based on the Sam & Max comic book series created by Steve Purcell. It is a sequel to Telltale's previous Sam & Max game, Sam & Max Save the World, and was originally released as five episodes for Microsoft Windows over the course of late 2007 and early 2008, before being ported to other platforms in the following years. A remaster of the game by Skunkape Games was released in December 2021 for Windows, Nintendo Switch and Xbox One, and in September 2022 for PlayStation 4.

Gameplay
Beyond Time and Space builds on Save the World with more dynamic NPCs, an updated engine, a hint system, support for widescreen monitors, more realistic animations, and more mini-games within each episode. Beyond Time and Space features a calibration assistant when first run, which allows the player to set their graphics and difficulty settings before playing.

Release
Unlike Save the World, where GameTap users were able to access each episode two weeks before it was available through Telltale's website, Beyond Time and Space reduced this period down to one day. The first episode, "Ice Station Santa", was released on November 8 on GameTap, followed by a worldwide release on November 9. The second episode was delayed until January 11, 2008. New episodes were thereafter released on the second Thursday and Friday of each month.

As with Save the World in 2007, Beyond Time and Space was released on Steam on May 16, 2008.

Atari published Sam & Max Beyond Time and Space worldwide for both Microsoft Windows (in 2009) and Wii (in 2010). The game also received fully localized releases in French and German, as well as Italian and Spanish subtitles for the foreign language versions of Beyond Time and Space.

Sam & Max Season One and Two were released for Xbox Live Arcade in February 2009. Telltale also officially named Season Two Beyond Time and Space.

A remaster by Skunkape Games was released in December 2021 for Windows, Nintendo Switch, and Xbox One, and in September 2022 for PlayStation 4. Like the Save the World remaster, it features new cinematics and music, improved character models and lighting, and some re-recorded dialogue.

Synopsis 
A year after the events of the previous game, Freelance Police Sam and Max discover their pet goldfish Mr. Spatula has turned evil, but he is killed by a giant robot (The Maimtron 9000) sent by Santa Claus. The two head to the North Pole and find Santa firing upon the elves with a machine gun. Suspecting Santa is possessed, Sam and Max conduct an exorcism, but discover the demon (The Shambling Corporate Presence) is possessing an elf instead. With help from the Spirits of Christmas Past, Present, and Future, the demon is reduced to a plate of Jell-O, which Santa inadvertently eats and becomes possessed. Sam and Max knock Santa out, The Soda Poppers (a trio of former child star brothers from the last game) who came to the North Pole to return a bunch of lame presents they got from Santa reveal the demon was meant for Satan but sent to Santa due to a typo. They send Santa to Hell and Sam and Max deliver all the Christmas presents in his place.

A month later, Sybil and Abe get sucked into a Bermuda Triangle portal. Sam and Max follow and arrive on Easter Island, populated by missing people turned to babies by the Fountain of Youth, and are told by the local Moai that a prophecy states that a volcano will erupt and destroy them. In a nearby cave, they discover a group of aquatic Ocean Chimps who worship the Moai's giant stone feet, and the ghost of Mr. Spatula has established himself as their High Priest, planning to use a machine to trigger an eruption. Sam convinces the Ocean Chimps that Max is the true High Priest, but Mr. Spatula sets off the eruption, only for Sam and Max to use a giant Bermuda Triangle to divert the lava. The two swim back to shore with Abe, who has broken up with Sybil, while the Moai are suddenly abducted.

Sometime later, the city is attacked by zombies from the Zombie Factory, a nightclub in Stuttgart run by the vampire Jurgen. Using traditional vampire weaknesses to lower Jurgen's popularity and make him vulnerable, Sam and Max pursue Jurgen but get caught in a death-trap and killed. The two reawaken as zombies and find Jurgen sleeping in his coffin and their souls trapped waiting to be shipped off to Hell. They retrieve a Soul Mater device from Sybil, inadvertently convincing her to get back together with Abe, but accidentally end up in each other's bodies. The two force Jurgen into his own deathtrap, and his soul is abducted. As Sam and Max return to their bodies, their neighbor and fellow detective Flint Paper arrives to announce Bosco has gone missing.

The three break into Bosco's store to look for clues, but Sam and Max inadvertently signal a UFO, which abducts them. They find Bosco, who has turned into a cow after stumbling into a time-traveling elevator and inadvertently altering the events of his birth. Sam and Max use the elevator to travel through time and restore Bosco, and they discover the UFO is piloted by past, present and future versions of a mariachi named Pedro, who travel through time in order to perform at everyone's birthday and collect souls for Hell to pay for their spaceship. Bosco is overwhelmed and dies of a heart attack, and the mariachis decide to use his soul to fill their quota. Sam and Max trick the mariachis into leaving so they can rescue Bosco's soul, but they accidentally send it to Hell and trigger the ship's self-destruct sequence. The two follow Bosco's soul through the portal, while the spaceship explodes just as it reaches the beginning of time, causing the Big Bang.

Sam and Max emerge in a subway station to Hell below their office. After gaining access to the train, they discover Hell to be an office environment employing their deceased enemies from past episodes. Satan ignores the two, but they interfere by freeing all their deceased friends' souls from their personal Hells. Sam demands that all these souls be released, and Satan agrees, but tricks Sam into taking their place. Max frees Sam, only to discover Satan is no longer in charge of Hell, which has been taken over by the Soda Poppers. The trio fire Satan and initiate a series of new evil plots, but Sam and Max thwart each of these and convince Satan to join them in retaking Hell. The Soda Poppers assume demonic forms and attempt to kill Sam & Max, but are tricked into using their own banishing ritual against themselves, trapping them in a fiery pit and allowing Satan to take back control. Everyone then leaves to attend Abe and Sybil's wedding. In a post-credits scene, the Soda Poppers swear revenge, only to be killed by the diverted lava flow from Easter Island.

Recurring characters 

In addition to the characters already introduced through Sam & Max Save the World, Beyond Time and Space introduces some additional recurring characters.

 Flint Paper: Flint runs his own gumshoe detective business in the office next to Sam & Max, but what exactly his business or cases are remains a mystery. As in the comics, his days consist of beating up bad guys and wooing attractive female clients. In Beyond Time and Space, he is on a case to track down the man who trashed Mama Bosco's store in the 60s. In Sam and Max Hit the Road, Flint and the door to his office were featured in the second location of the game, where he threw someone out of a window and shot a smiley face into the wall with a tommy gun. Curiously, when asked where he'd been, his adventures sound near-identical to Sam & Max's.
 Stinky: A young lady who owns "Stinky's Diner" across the street from Bosco's store. She claims to have inherited the diner, and her name, from Grandpa Stinky, her supposed grandfather. The claims (and Grandpa Stinky's fate) are questionable, as Stinky is also a constant liar, claiming that she is a very famous actress, inventor of artifacts, and studied beliefs, like "voodoo queen". This causes Sam and Max to have increasing suspicions that Stinky has murdered Grandpa Stinky to take over the diner. Sam and Max meet the original "Grandpa" Stinky in episode 4, "Chariots of the Dogs", after traveling through time to the early 1980s version of Stinky's Diner. The older Stinky has a strong dislike for the U.S. government, and has a tendency to exaggerate his exploits, much like the younger Stinky from 2008, though the old Stinky claims to never having had any children. In episode 5, Grandpa Stinky revealed that he had really died in a mountain climbing accident, and girl Stinky is actually his protege. In actuality, girl Stinky is a golem, "The Cake of the Damned", an unholy concoction created by Grandpa Stinky from an entree (Fish sticks), a side dish (Tar Cake), and a dessert (Coffee Ice Cream), and brought to life in human form by adding a spare rib into the mix.
 Mister Spatula: Sam and Max's pet goldfish who lives in the office water cooler. In Save the World, he was made Vice President of the United States under Max's administration, but he soon developed a lust for power that turned him "pure evil" according to Sam. He becomes the High Priest of Easter Island before Max takes over in "Moai Better Blues".
 The Maimtron 9000: A giant robot (first briefly seen through a window in Episode 5 of Save the World) that demolishes half of the neighborhood in Episode 1, "Ice Station Santa", thought to have been sent by Mister Spatula to assassinate Max. He says his only function is to kill and destroy, but in conversation he will frequently respond to questions with lyrics of pop songs of the 80's and 90's. After being deactivated by Sam, his collapsed body is converted into a casino for rats by Jimmy Two-Teeth. The Maimtron 9000 is reactivated in the season finale by Sam and Max using the portable A.I. acquired in the previous title.
 Santa Claus: A figure known for bringing gifts to children on Christmas. In episode 1, "Ice Station Santa", he is seen hiding in his room standing on top of a safe containing the spirits of Christmas. After the battle with the Shambling Corporate Presence, Santa accidentally eats the jello that SCP turned into, causing him to be possessed. After Sam & Max fight Santa again, Santa is sent to hell. In episode 5, he is imprisoned in his personal hell. He must constantly recall toys for various safety issues, while constantly being harassed by demon babies, saying that he hates kids, and took the one job in the world where he'd only ever have to be around children once a year.
 Jurgen: A German Goth styled vampire, he is the main villain of episode 3, "Night of the Raving Dead", and had a brief appearance in episode 4. He reappears in Episode 5 as a receptionist in Hell and is still angry at both Sam & Max for landing him in his predicament.
 Pedro: A Mariachi singer who suddenly appears and sings a birthday song whenever a character mentions a personal birthday. He has made brief appearances in episodes 1 through 3, and was given a larger role in episode 4, "Chariots of the Dogs" as well as having a small role in the season finale. Pedro was first named in episode 4.
 Shambling Corporate Presence: A gelatinous demon from Hell and the main villain of episode 1, "Ice Station Santa". He re-appears as an employee of Hell, LLC in episode 5, and was a minor character in "Reality 1.5", the game-within-a-game in the Save the World episode, "Reality 2.0".
Timmy Two-Teeth: Jimmy Two-Teeth's son was introduced in episode 1, along with Jimmy's ex-wife and Timmy's mother, Mary Two-Teeth. Timmy is a young rat diagnosed with terminal Tourette syndrome; as a consequence, a large part of his speech is censored (although in a sense of irony, he doesn't really swear, but says stuff like 'Heck yeah' or 'Have a flippin' day'). Despite this, he maintains a positive outlook on life. He dies in episode 5 and his soul goes to hell due to both Sam & Max's intervention (unlike his father, Timmy has lived a sin-free life, but his personal record was switched with Jimmy's at the moment of his death), but later his soul is released and Timmy comes back to life. He is also a great fan of the Soda Poppers and knows everything about them.

Episodes

Reception

Episode 1: Ice Station Santa
Episode 1: Ice Station Santa received positive reviews. It received an aggregated score of 82% on GameRankings based on 32 reviews and 82/100 on Metacritic based on 32 reviews.

Episode 2: Moai Better Blues
Episode 2: Moai Better Blues received positive reviews. It received an aggregated score of 81% on GameRankings based on 32 reviews and 80/100 on Metacritic based on 30 reviews.

Episode 3: Night of the Raving Dead
Episode 3: Night of the Raving Dead received positive reviews. It received an aggregated score of 80% on GameRankings based on 28 reviews and 79/100 on Metacritic based on 26 reviews.

Episode 4: Chariots of the Dogs
Episode 4: Chariots of the Dogs received positive reviews. It received an aggregated score of 85% on GameRankings based on 27 reviews and 85/100 on Metacritic based on 23 reviews.

Episode 5: What's New, Beelzebub?
Episode 5: What's New, Beelzebub? received positive reviews. It received an aggregated score of 85% on GameRankings based on 22 reviews and 85/100 on Metacritic based on 20 reviews.

References

External links

Notes

2007 video games
Christmas video games
Episodic video games
Point-and-click adventure games
IOS games
Wii games
MacOS games
Windows games
Xbox 360 games
Bandai Namco games
PlayStation 3 games
Telltale Games games
PlayStation Network games
Xbox 360 Live Arcade games
Nintendo Switch games
Xbox One games
PlayStation 4 games
Video game sequels
Video games based on Sam & Max
Video games about dogs
Video games about rabbits and hares
Video games set in Germany
Video games set in New York City
Video games set in the United States
Video games scored by Jared Emerson-Johnson
Video games developed in the United States
Single-player video games